The DAR 4 was a prototype airliner built in Bulgaria in 1930.

Design and development
The DAR 4 was a conventional biplane design, with unstaggered wings of unequal span braced with Warren trusses. The fuselage offered fully enclosed accommodation for the two pilots and four passengers. A curious feature of the design was that the top wing was not attached directly to the top of the fuselage as is common in cabin biplanes, but was mounted above it with cabane struts. Power was provided by three radial engines; one in the nose, and one mounted on each lower wing where the struts met. Performance was disappointing, and in particular, the narrow track of the undercarriage created difficulties. After the single prototype, no further examples were built.

Specifications

References

 
 

1930s Bulgarian airliners
DAR 04
Trimotors
Biplanes